Saint-Joseph-de-Kamouraska is a parish municipality in the Canadian province of Quebec, located in the Kamouraska Regional County Municipality.

Demographics 

See also
 List of parish municipalities in Quebec

References

External links
 

Parish municipalities in Quebec
Incorporated places in Bas-Saint-Laurent